Dioxygen complexes are coordination compounds that contain O2 as a ligand. The study of these compounds is inspired by oxygen-carrying proteins such as myoglobin, hemoglobin, hemerythrin, and hemocyanin.  Several transition metals form complexes with O2, and many of these complexes form reversibly.  The binding of O2 is the first step in many important phenomena, such as cellular respiration, corrosion, and industrial chemistry.  The first synthetic oxygen complex was demonstrated in 1938 with cobalt(II) complex reversibly bound O2.

Mononuclear complexes of O2
O2 binds to a single metal center either “end-on” (η1-) or “side-on” (η2-). The bonding and structures of these compounds are usually evaluated by single-crystal X-ray crystallography, focusing both on the overall geometry as well as the O–O distances, which reveals the bond order of the O2 ligand.

Complexes of η1-O2 ligands

O2 adducts derived from cobalt(II) and iron(II) complexes of porphyrin (and related anionic macrocyclic ligands) exhibit this bonding mode. Myoglobin and hemoglobin are famous examples, and many synthetic analogues have been described that behave similarly.  Binding of O2 is usually described as proceeding by electron transfer from the metal(II) center to give superoxide complexes of metal(III) centers. As shown by the mechanisms of cytochrome P450 and alpha-ketoglutarate-dependent hydroxylase, Fe-η1-O2 bonding is conducive to formation of Fe(IV) oxo centers. O2 can bind to one metal of a bimetallic unit via the same modes discussed above for mononuclear complexes. A well-known example is the active site of the protein hemerythrin, which features a diiron carboxylate that binds O2 at one Fe center. Dinuclear complexes can also cooperate in the binding, although the initial attack of O2 probably occurs at a single metal.

Complexes of η2-O2 ligands
η2-bonding is the most common motif seen in coordination chemistry of dioxygen.  Such complexes can be generated by treating low-valent metal complexes with oxygen.  For example, Vaska's complex reversibly binds O2 (Ph = C6H5):
IrCl(CO)(PPh3)2 + O2  IrCl(CO)(PPh3)2O2
The conversion is described as a 2 e− redox process: Ir(I) converts to Ir(III) as dioxygen converts to peroxide. Since O2 has a triplet ground state and Vaska's complex is a singlet, the reaction is slower than when singlet oxygen is used. The magnetic properties of some  η2-O2 complexes show that the ligand, in fact, is superoxide, not peroxide.

Most complexes of η2-O2 are generated using hydrogen peroxide, not from O2.  Chromate ([CrO4)]2−) can for example be converted to the tetraperoxide [Cr(O2)4]2−.  The reaction of hydrogen peroxide with aqueous titanium(IV) gives a brightly colored peroxy complex that is a useful test for titanium as well as hydrogen peroxide.

Binuclear complexes of O2

These binding modes include μ2-η2,η2-, μ2-η1,η1-, and μ2-η1,η2-.  Depending on the degree of electron-transfer from the dimetal unit, these O2 ligands can again be described as peroxo or superoxo. Hemocyanin is an O2-carrier that utilizes a bridging O2 binding motif. It features a pair of copper centers.

.
Salcomine, the cobalt(II) complex of salen ligand is the first synthetic O2 carrier. Solvated derivatives of the solid complex bind 0.5 equivalent of O2:
2 Co(salen) + O2 → [Co(salen)]2O2

Reversible electron transfer reactions are observed in some dinuclear O2 complexes.

Relationship to other oxygenic ligands and applications
Dioxygen complexes are the precursors to other families of oxygenic ligands.  Metal oxo compounds arise from the cleavage of the O–O bond after complexation. Hydroperoxo complexes are generated in the course of the reduction of dioxygen by metals. The reduction of O2 by metal catalysts is a key half-reaction in fuel cells.

Metal-catalyzed oxidations with O2 proceed via the intermediacy of dioxygen complexes, although the actual oxidants are often oxo derivatives. The reversible binding of O2 to metal complexes has been used as a means to purify oxygen from air, but cryogenic distillation of liquid air remains the dominant technology.

References

Coordination complexes
Biochemistry
Inorganic chemistry